The Sons of Lee Marvin is a tongue-in-cheek secret society devoted to iconic American actor Lee Marvin. The sole entry requirement for the club is that one must have a physical resemblance to plausibly look like a son of Marvin.

Founding member and film director Jim Jarmusch explained, "If you look like you could be a son of Lee Marvin, then you are instantly thought of by the Sons of Lee Marvin to be a Son of Lee Marvin". 

Members
Besides Jarmusch, the founding members of the society are said to include the actors and musicians Tom Waits, John Lurie, and Richard Boes. Musician Nick Cave, whom Jarmusch knew when living in Berlin, was inducted as a member after having been mistaken for a brother of the director. Director John Boorman is an honorary member, having been presented with one of the society's elaborate Waits-designed business cards. Others rumored to be members include Thurston Moore, Iggy Pop, Josh Brolin and Neil Young though none have been formally recognized by the society, which refuses to disclose its inner workings to the public. The society meets occasionally, supposedly to watch Lee Marvin films together.

Mythology
The society's members perpetuate the joke in the media. Tom Waits described it to Rolling Stone in 1986 as "somewhere between the Elks Club and the Academy Awards", and claimed to have met Jarmusch at an annual meeting of the New York chapter. When asked about the society by friend and collaborator Lucy Sante in a 1989 interview, Jarmusch commented "I'm not at liberty to divulge information about the organization, other than to tell you that it does exist. I can identify three other members of the organization: Tom Waits, John Lurie, and Richard Boes ... You have to have a facial structure such that you could be related to, or be a son of, Lee Marvin. There are no women, obviously, in the organization. We have communiques and secret meetings. Other than that, I can't talk about it." Jarmusch revealed in a 1992 interview that the real son of Lee Marvin, Christopher,  had objected to the existence of the organization in an encounter with Waits at a bar:

Christopher Marvin, a professional drummer and the only son of Lee Marvin, featured as a guest artist on the song "Cold Water" from Waits's album Mule Variations (1999).

The Sons

Citations

References

External links
 The Sons of Lee Marvin at The Jim Jarmusch Resource Page, curated by Jarmusch scholar Ludvig Hertzberg
 The Sons of Lee Marvin, an essay by Phil Snyder originally published in Eyewash in 1993 and preserved by the Internet Archive.

Celebrity fandom
Film fan clubs
Secret societies in the United States